Cyzenis is a genus of parasitic flies in the family Tachinidae.  Known hosts are immature Lepidoptera, and the species C. albicans has been used for biological control of winter moths.

Species
C. albicans (Fallén, 1810)
C. browni (Curran, 1933)
C. incrassata (Smith, 1912)
C. jucunda (Meigen, 1838)
C. pullula (Townsend, 1915)
C. ustulata (Reinhard, 1959)

References

Tachinidae genera
Exoristinae
Taxa named by Jean-Baptiste Robineau-Desvoidy